Sylvester Groth (born 31 March 1958) is a German theater, television, and film actor. He is best known to international audiences from his appearances in Hollywood movies including Inglourious Basterds and The Man from U.N.C.L.E. Furthermore, he has appeared in the Netflix series Sense8, Fargo, and Dark.

Biography
Groth is the youngest of five siblings from Jerichow (Bezirk Magdeburg) in the former German Democratic Republic, where he also spent his childhood. His family is from Upper Silesia. Groth's father died while he was still young, and his mother married a second time. When he was 14 years old, the family moved to Leipzig. In 1986, he escaped from East Germany to West Germany.

He studied acting and singing at the Ernst Busch Academy of Dramatic Arts in Berlin. This was followed by engagements in Schwerin, Dresden, and Berlin, where he worked as a guest actor at the Deutsches Theater and from 1986 to 1989 at the Schaubühne. He also worked at the Residenz Theater, the Munich Kammerspiele, the Berliner Ensemble, the Burgtheater in Vienna, and the Salzburg Festival.

In addition to an extensive theater career, Groth has also acted in numerous television productions and feature films.
His first major film role was in 1983 in the East German film The Turning Point, based on a novel by Hermann Kant. In 1986, he appeared in Johannes Schaaf's adaptation of Michael Ende's story Momo. In 1992, he acted in the war drama Stalingrad and in 2006 he took on the role of Nazi Minister of Propaganda Joseph Goebbels in Dani Levy's My Führer – The Really Truest Truth about Adolf Hitler.

Groth is known to English-language audiences for appearing in Quentin Tarantino's 2009 film Inglourious Basterds, in which he also portrayed Goebbels. Most recently, he has held a leading role in the Netflix series Dark as Clausen, a police investigator, as well as appearing in the first episode of the third season of Fargo.

In January 2013, the Film Museum in Potsdam honoured Groth with a retrospective. On 1 December 2017, he received an award from the DEFA Foundation for his outstanding achievements in German film.

Selected filmography

Film

Television

Awards and honours 
 Heinrich Greif Prize for The Turning Point (1984)
 Television and film award from the German Academy of Performing Arts  for Romeo (2001)
 Grimme-Preis for Romeo (2002)
 Deutscher Kritikerpreis for the portrayal of Joseph Goebbels in My Führer – The Really Truest Truth about Adolf Hitler (2007)
 DEFA Foundation Prize for outstanding achievements in German film (2017)

References

External links

 

1958 births
Living people
People from Jerichower Land
German male film actors
German male television actors
German tenors
Outstanding Performance by a Cast in a Motion Picture Screen Actors Guild Award winners
Ernst Busch Academy of Dramatic Arts alumni
20th-century German male actors
21st-century German male actors
German male actors